The 2022–23 First Football League (also known as Prva nogometna liga and 1. NL) is the 32nd season of the second-level football competition for men's association football teams in Croatia, since its establishment in 1992. The season started on 13 August 2022 and will last until 19 March 2023.

The league is contested by 12 teams, four less than the previous season, and played in a triple round robin format. 

This is the first season that the second level of men's football in Croatia was named First football league (Prva nogometna liga).

Teams
The following teams will compete in the 2022–23 Prva NL.

Changes
Varaždin was promoted to the 2022–23 HNL, while Croatia Zmijavci, Osijek II, Sesvete and Opatija were relegated to 2022–23 Druga NL. Dinamo Zagreb II was disbanded.

New clubs were Hrvatski Dragovoljac (relegated after single season in the top flight), relegated from 2021–22 Prva HNL and Vukovar 1991, winner of playoff between winners of five third tier leagues.

Before the start of the season, Inter Zaprešić ended up in bankruptcy and was dissolved. Instead of them, Croatia Zmijavci, originally relegated, was returned to the league.

Stadia and locations

League table

Results

Notes

References 

2022-23
Croatia
2
Current association football seasons